Rugby in Sweden may refer to:

Rugby league in Sweden
Rugby union in Sweden